Trevor Ncala (born 11 December 1964) is a Swazi swimmer. He competed at the 1984 Summer Olympics and the 1988 Summer Olympics.

References

External links
 

1964 births
Living people
Swazi male swimmers
Olympic swimmers of Eswatini
Swimmers at the 1984 Summer Olympics
Swimmers at the 1988 Summer Olympics
Commonwealth Games competitors for Eswatini
Swimmers at the 1982 Commonwealth Games
Swimmers at the 1986 Commonwealth Games
Place of birth missing (living people)